Bratsch were a French-based music ensemble using influences from Roma (i.e. "Gypsy") music, klezmer, jazz and many diverse folk traditions.

History 
The group was formed in 1972 by guitarist Dan Gharibian and violinist Bruno Girard, and released its first album in 1976. They have released more than ten albums to date. The group was renowned for the diversity of its musical influences and for the virtuosity of its members and guest artists. After more than 40 years of success, the group ended their career by giving a final concert on December 31, 2015.

Members
Dan Gharibian: guitar, bouzouki, vocals
Bruno Girard: violin, vocals
Théo Girard: double bass
Nano Peylet: clarinet
François Castiello: accordion, vocals

Discography

Albums
1976: Musiques de partout
1978: J'aime un voyou, maman
1981: Live à la Potinière
1989: Notes de voyage
1990: Sans domicile fixe
1992: Transports en commun
1993: Gipsy Music From the Heart of Europe
1994: Correspondances
1994: Le Mangeur de lune (soundtrack of film Dai Sijie)
1996: Ecoute ça chérie
1997: Terre Promise 
1998: Rien dans les poches
1999: On a rendez-vous (Live)
2001: La vie, la mort, tout ça...
2003: Nomades en vol (Best of)
2005: Ca s'fête (Best of Live for 25th anniversary)
2007: Plein du monde2011: Urban Bratsch2013: Brut de Bratsch 1973→2013'' (compilation, 3xCD+DVD)

References

External links
Bratsch official (Facebook)  

French Romani musical groups